Gordon Kampe (born 10 September 1976) is a German composer and academic teacher.

Career
Kampe was born in Herne, North Rhine-Westphalia, Germany. He completed an apprenticeship as an electrician in 1995 and studied after his Abitur composition with Hans-Joachim Hespos, Adriana Hölszky (Rostock) and Nicolaus A. Huber (Essen). In 2008, he finished his dissertation about fairy tale opera of the 20th century at the Folkwang University of the Arts.

Kampe is notably interested in the opera. Since 2009 he has written a number of commissioned works, among other for the Stuttgart State Opera (Zivilcourage. Musik für einen Platz, world premiere 2009), the Oldenburg State Theatre (ANOIA, world premiere 2012) and the Deutsche Oper Berlin (Kannst du pfeifen, Johanna, world premiere 2013). The world premiere of PLÄTZE. DÄCHER. LEUTE. WEGE. Musiktheater für ein utopisches Bielefeld took place at Bielefeld Opera in 2015.

Kampe has been a professor of composition and music theory at the Hochschule für Musik und Theater Hamburg since 2017. He lives and works in Hamburg, Germany.

Awards
 2007 Kompositionspreis der Landeshauptstadt Stuttgart
 2011 Kompositionspreis der Landeshauptstadt Stuttgart
 2016 Ernst von Siemens Composers' Prize
 2016 Schneider-Schott Music Prize

Scholarships
 2007 Cité internationale des arts
 2008 Künstlerhof Schreyahn
 2017/2018 Villa Massimo

Memberships
 2019 Freie Akademie der Künste Hamburg

Discography

 Gordon Kampe: HAL / High Noon: Moskitos / Ripley-Musik V / Qs Nachtstück / Picard / Gassenhauermaschinensuite WERGO 2011 (WER 6581 2)
 "Nischenmusik mit Klopfgeistern", Decoder Ensemble für Aktuelle Musik, Ahornfelder 2015 (AH27)
 "Falsche Lieder", Neue Vocalsolisten Stuttgart: Drama, col legno 2014 (WWE 1CD 20413)
 "heavy metal", Beatrix Wagner - Spiegelungen, Edition Zeitklang (ez 44046)
 "zu drei Stücken entzwei", Magic Flute Remixed, GENUIN 2006 (GEN 86078)

References

Further reading 

 Drees, Stefan. 2008. “Gordon Kampe”, Komponisten der Gegenwart (KDG), edited by H.-W. Heister, W.-W. 37. Nachlieferung, Sparrer, München: edition text + kritik, 
 Neuner, Florian. 2010. “‘Informationen aus dem Gamma-Quadranten’. Die musikalischen Parallelwelten des Gordon Kampe”, MusikTexte 125, p.5–9
 Kampe, Gordon. 2012. Topoi - Gesten - Atmosphären. Märchenopern im 20. Jahrhundert, Saarbrücken: Pfau,  (Dissertation)
 Kampe, Gordon. 2015. (with Ivan Bazak, Katharina Ortmann) Plätze. Dächer. Leute. Wege. Die Stadt als utopische Bühne, Bielefeld: transcript,

External links
 

1976 births
Living people
German opera composers
Male opera composers
21st-century classical composers
Ernst von Siemens Composers' Prize winners
German male classical composers
People from Herne, North Rhine-Westphalia
Rostock University of Music and Theatre alumni
Ruhr University Bochum alumni
21st-century German composers
21st-century German male musicians